Johnny Eduardo Pinnock (1942 - 2000) served as Joint Prime Minister of the Democratic People's Republic of Angola, alongside José Ndele, from November 23, 1975 to February 11, 1976. His political party was FNLA.

References

1942 births
2000 deaths
Angolan politicians
Prime Ministers of Angola
National Liberation Front of Angola politicians